Magisters was a large CIS-based law firm. The firm was founded in Kyiv, Ukraine, in 1997, as Magister & Partners. The firm has since changed its name to Magisters and expanded across the territory of the Commonwealth of Independent States. In July 2011, Magisters merged with Egorov Puginsky Afanasiev & Partners.

History 
The firm was founded in 1997 in Ukraine as "Magister & Partners" by two young lawyers – Oleg Riabokon and Serhii Sviriba. Riabokon and Sviriba were studying of the Kyiv Institute of International Relations Law department, and the idea to establish a law firm came to them right at the university prom.

In 2006, "Magister & Partners" merged with Ukrainian law firm "Pravis:Reznikov, Vlasenko & Partners" and launched in Russia by merging with "Legas Legal Solutions", this merge became the first-ever cross-border merger between independent law firms in the CIS and marked the beginning of the Firm's CIS-wide expansion.

After conducting a rebranding campaign in 2008 Magisters & Partners became Magisters.

The years 2008 and 2009 have been a period of active expansion for Magisters. The firm merged with a Belarusian law firm BelJurBureau and opened an office in Astana, Kazakhstan. Early 2009, Magisters also set up a representative office in London, UK.

The firm's Kyiv office was raided by the Ukrainian police on February 3, 2011, for undisclosed reasons.

In July 2011, Magisters merged with Egorov Puginsky Afanasiev & Partners.

References

External links 
Official firm website www.magisters.com
Chambers and Partners Firm Profile

See also
 List of largest law firms in Europe (excluding UK) (2009)

Law firms established in 1997
Law firms of Ukraine